The Vickers 14 inch 45 calibre gun was designed and built by Vickers and initially installed on the battlecruiser  which it was building for the Imperial Japanese Navy. Guns similar to this Vickers design were also later built in Japan to arm Kongōs sister ships and subsequent Japanese-constructed "super-dreadnoughts" which were all built in Japan.  Japanese-built versions of the guns were designated 14 inch 41st Year Type, and from 1917 when the Navy went metric they were redesignated 36 cm 41st Year Type.

History
The original design for the Kongō class featured 12-inch (304.8 mm) 50-caliber guns. Cdr Katô Hirohasu of the Imperial Japanese Navy pushed for the adoption of the new 14-inch gun that was currently under development. After trials of the new gun, which were witnessed by both the Japanese Navy and Royal Navy, the Japanese made the decision on 29 Nov 1911 to use the new gun in Kongō despite her keel having already been laid down on 17 January 1911, and the resulting need to quickly make a large number of alternations to the design, so as to not prolong the construction.

This gun armed the following Japanese warships:
 s, launched 1912 - 1913:
 Kongō
 Hiei
 Kirishima
 Haruna
 s, launched 1915:
 Fusō
 Yamashiro
 s, launched 1916 - 1917:
 Ise
 Hyūga

See also
 List of naval guns

Weapons of comparable role, performance and era
 14-inch/45-caliber gun US equivalent
 340mm/45 Modèle 1912 gun French equivalent
 EOC 14-inch 45-calibre naval gun Elswick Ordnance (Britain) equivalent
 BL 14-inch Mk VII naval gun more modern British equivalent

References

Bibliography
 
 Tony DiGiulian, Japan 14"/45 (35.6 cm) Vickers Mark "A" - 14"/45 (35.6 cm) 43rd Year Type - 14"/45 (35.6 cm) 41st Year Type - 36 cm/45 (14") 41st Year Type

External links

 Japan 36 cm/45 (14") 41st Year Type - NavWeaps

 

Naval guns of Japan
356 mm artillery
Vickers